The 1940 Boston University Terriers football team was an American football team that represented Boston University as an independent during the 1940 college football season. In its seventh season under head coach Pat Hanley, the team compiled a 5–3 record and outscored opponents by a total of 160 to 73.

Schedule

References

Boston University
Boston University Terriers football seasons
Boston University Terriers football